Eulalia Ares de Vildoza (1809–1884), was an Argentinian coup leader who famously deposed the governor of the Catamarca Province in 1862. 

She married the military and landowner José Domingo Vildoza (1799–1870) in 1827. In 1862, she organized the deposition of the governor of the Catamarca Province during the War between the Argentine Confederation and the state of Buenos Aires. During the absence of her spouse, she managed to take over the provincial government building, deposed the province governor and take control of the province until the troops of her spouse arrived and new elections could be arranged.

References
 Cutolo, Vicente Osvaldo (1968). Nuevo diccionario biográfico argentino (1750-1930). Buenos Aires: Editorial Elche.
 Yaben, Jacinto R. (1952). Biografías argentinas y sudamericanas. Buenos Aires: Ediciones Historicas Argentinas.

1809 births
1884 deaths
19th-century Argentine people
Women in 19th-century warfare
Women in war in South America